The Zamuri hills are a mountain range located in the Kalat District of Balochistan, Pakistan.

References

Mountain ranges of Balochistan (Pakistan)